Provincial Route 1 is a  long paved highway located in the partidos of La Plata and Berazategui in the province of Buenos Aires, in Argentina. From its beginning to the Cruce Gutiérrez, the route is part of the Camino General Belgrano, a road paved between 1912 and 1916, which is a narrow road with one lane in each direction. The rest of the route belongs to Camino Centenario.

It was part of National Route 1 (km 34.10 to 54.00) until the national government transferred this road to the province in 1988.

References

Provincial roads in Buenos Aires Province